Didiba is a village in Tanganyika Province, Democratic Republic of the Congo.

References 

Populated places in Tanganyika Province